Bovisand is a natural coastline on the east side of Plymouth Sound in Devon, England.
Despite the steep cliff paths and rocky surrounding, Bovisand features two beaches, a holiday park, privately owned bungalows and a diving centre at Fort Bovisand. The area, in the vicinity of Plymouth and Wembury, is used predominantly by locals, while tourists prefer the larger and better-known beaches elsewhere. It is often referred to as simply Bovi by locals. It lies just outside the boundaries of the city of Plymouth and instead within the district of South Hams.

There are two beaches at Bovisand, the first named Bovisand Bay is the northernmost separated from the southernmost, Crownhill Bay, by rocks and a grass bank, commonly known as "Grassy". Both beaches are accessible only by steps, and are served by a cafe and a small tourist shop, but have no lifeguards.

The view from Bovisands includes Plymouth Breakwater, Mount Edgcumbe in Cornwall just across Plymouth Sound, and the English Channel.

External links
 Bovicam - Bovisand beach webcam

Landforms of Devon
Plymouth, Devon
Beaches of Devon